Juan Sebastián Cabal and Robert Farah were the defending champions, but chose to compete in Acapulco instead.

Julio Peralta and Horacio Zeballos won the title, defeating Pablo Carreño Busta and David Marrero in the final, 4–6, 6–1, [10–5].

Seeds

Draw

Draw

References
 Main Draw

2016 Brasil Open